San Juan Alto is a station of the Seville Metro on line 1 named after its situation, in the neighborhood of the municipality of San Juan de Aznalfarache, Seville. It is located close toA-8057 road and Clara Campoamor St. San Juan Alto is a semi-underground building, situated between Cavaleri and San Juan Alto stations on the same line. It was opened on 2 April 2009.

Connections
Bus: M-150, M-151, M-152, M-153, M-155

See also
 List of Seville metro stations

References

External links 
  Official site.
 History, construction details and maps.

Seville Metro stations
Railway stations in Spain opened in 2009